Post machine may refer to:
 Post tag system
 Post–Turing machine